Vandœuvre-lès-Nancy (literally Vandœuvre near Nancy) is a commune in the Meurthe-et-Moselle department in north-eastern France. Its inhabitants are called Vandopériens.

Geography
With 29,942 inhabitants (2019), Vandœuvre is the second-largest commune in the Meurthe-et-Moselle department, after the capital Nancy, of which it is a suburb. These two cities belong to the same agglomeration community: Grand Nancy.

Population

Municipal market

The municipal market of Vandœuvre hosts 120–150 merchants and 6,000–8,000 visitors on Sunday mornings.

Twin towns – sister cities

Vandœuvre-lès-Nancy is twinned with:
 Gedling, England, United Kingdom
 Grottaferrata, Italy
 Lemgo, Germany
 Poa, Burkina Faso
 Ponte de Lima, Portugal

See also
École Nationale Supérieure d'Agronomie et des Industries Alimentaires
École Supérieure des Sciences et Technologies de l'Ingénieur de Nancy
INIST (CNRS database)
Communes of the Meurthe-et-Moselle department

References

External links

Official website

Vandoeuvrelesnancy
Meurthe-et-Moselle communes articles needing translation from French Wikipedia